Sreerupa Bose ( – 30 November 2017) was a One Day International cricketer who represented the Indian women's cricket team. She played two One Day Internationals. She was batsman and a bowler.

She studied at the Scottish Church College of the University of Calcutta. She was the captain of Indian women's team against England led by Virginia Wed. Later she also succeeded as sport administrator. She was appointed Joint Director at SAI Kolkata and still remembered by all her subordinates and the players and other trainers.

References

1950s births
Year of birth missing
2017 deaths
Bengal women cricketers
India women One Day International cricketers
Indian women cricketers
Scottish Church College alumni
University of Calcutta alumni